Scrobipalpa subroseata is a moth in the family Gelechiidae. It was described by Edward Meyrick in 1932. It is found in Uganda.

References

Scrobipalpa
Moths described in 1932